Sterling "Steelo" Brim (born June 5, 1988) is an American television personality, comedian, and actor. He is a co-host and producer of MTV's Ridiculousness.

Biography
Brim was born and raised in Chicago, Illinois. His mother, Tracy Brim, is a pastor, and his father, Frank Brim, is a Chicago Fire Department Battalion Chief. His father started a baseball team on the west side of Chicago through Garfield Park. Brim also has two brothers and a sister.

In 2001, Brim had a small role in the film Hardball. At the age of 19, Brim moved to Los Angeles to pursue a career in the music industry. He worked in radio and A&R before he met Rob Dyrdek. Dyrdek invited him to be co-host of his new MTV show Ridiculousness, along with Chanel West Coast. Brim holds the position of the creative producer of the show. Brim has also appeared in Rob Dyrdek's Fantasy Factory and Wild Grinders.

Brim is the co-host of the podcast Wine and Weed'', with Chris Reinacher. More recently, he had a first look deal at MTV Entertainment Studios.

Filmography

References

External links
 Ridiculouness on MTV.com  – click Cast and Sterling "Steelo" Brim for profile 
 

1988 births
Living people
Male actors from Chicago
American television personalities
African-American male actors
African-American television personalities
21st-century American male actors
American male film actors
Television personalities from Chicago
21st-century African-American people
20th-century African-American people